Synaphea pinnata, commonly known as Helena synaphea, is a shrub endemic to Western Australia.

It blooms between August and November producing yellow flowers.

It is found in the Darling Scarp and the hills in the eastern suburbs of Perth including Mundaring, Kalamunda and Gosnells where it grows in sandy-clay-loamy soils over laterite or granite.

References

Eudicots of Western Australia
pinnata
Endemic flora of Western Australia
Plants described in 1839